Karaulia is a village in Jagat block, Budaun district, Uttar Pradesh, India. Its village code is 128387. The village is administrated by Gram panchayat. Budaun railway station is 7 km away from the village. As per the report of 2011 Census of India, The total population of the village is 1759, where 928 are males and 831 are females.

References

Villages in Budaun district